Freedom on Parole is a 2010 Danish comedy-drama written and directed by and starring Erik Clausen, Helene Egelund, Jesper Asholt, and . The film was produced by Clausen Film and distributed by Nordisk Film, and follows up on themes in Clausen's 2007 film Temporary Release.

Plot 
The middle-aged petty criminal John is released on probation. John travels to Jutland to help his son, who by his own admission is knee deep in shit. Finally, John has a chance to be the father, he always wanted to be. John does everything to solve his son and daughter-in-law's problems. But the reality is more varied, and when John finds out that he is the grandfather of a colored child, that he will have to take three different jobs, that he falls in love, and that he is a hunted man.

Cast 
 Erik Clausen as John
 Helene Egelund as Jeanne
 Jesper Asholt as Bo
  as Mads Ole
  as Kenneth
  as Bettina
  as Sømmet (as Elith 'Nulle' Nykjær)
 Peter Plaugborg as Originalen
  as Fru Sørensen
  as Muhammedtegneren

References

External links 
 
 
 

2010 films
2010s Danish-language films
Danish comedy-drama films
Films shot in Denmark
Films directed by Erik Clausen
2010 comedy-drama films